Chesley Knight Bonestell Jr. (January 1, 1888 – June 11, 1986) was an American painter, designer, and illustrator. His paintings inspired the American space program, and they have been (and remain) influential in science fiction art and illustration. A pioneering creator of astronomical art, along with the French astronomer-artist Lucien Rudaux, Bonestell has been dubbed the "Father of Modern Space art".

Life and career

Early years
Bonestell was born in San Francisco, California. His first astronomical painting was done in 1905. After seeing Saturn through the  telescope at San Jose's Lick Observatory, he rushed home to paint what he had seen. The painting was destroyed in the fire that followed the 1906 earthquake. Between 1915 and 1918, he exhibited lithographs in the 4th and 7th annual exhibitions of the California Society of Etchers (now the California Society of Printmakers) in San Francisco.

Bonestell studied architecture at Columbia University in New York City. Dropping out in his third year, he worked as a renderer and designer for several of the leading architectural firms of the time, including the firm of Willis Polk, "The Man Who Rebuilt San Francisco."

Bonestell moved to England in 1920, where he rendered architectural subjects for the Illustrated London News. He returned to New York in 1926. While with William van Alen, he and Warren Straton designed the art deco façade of the Chrysler Building as well as its distinctive eagles. During this same period, he designed the Plymouth Rock Memorial, the U.S. Supreme Court Building, the New York Central Building, Manhattan office and apartment buildings and several state capitols.

Returning to the West Coast, he prepared illustrations of the chief engineer's plans for the Golden Gate Bridge for the benefit of funders. In the late 1930s he moved to Hollywood, where he worked (without screen credit) as a special effects artist, creating matte paintings for films, including The Hunchback of Notre Dame (1939), Citizen Kane (1941) and The Magnificent Ambersons (1942).

Magazines

Bonestell then realized that he could combine what he had learned about camera angles, miniature modeling, and painting techniques with his lifelong interest in astronomy. The result was a series of paintings of Saturn as seen from several of its moons that was published in Life in 1944. Nothing like these had ever been seen before: they looked as though photographers had been sent into space. His painting "Saturn as Seen from Titan" is perhaps the most famous astronomical landscape ever, and is nicknamed "the painting that launched a thousand careers." It was constructed with a combination of clay models, photographic tricks and various painting techniques. (Titan has a thick haze; such a view is probably not possible in reality.)

Bonestell followed up the sensation these paintings created by publishing more paintings in many leading national magazines. These and others were eventually collected in the best-selling book The Conquest of Space (1949), produced in collaboration with author Willy Ley. Bonestell's last work in Hollywood was contributing special effects art and technical advice to the seminal science fiction films produced by George Pal, including Destination Moon, When Worlds Collide, The War of the Worlds and Conquest of Space, as well as Cat-Women of the Moon. Beginning with the October 1947 issue of Astounding Science Fiction, Bonestell painted more than 60 cover illustrations for science fiction magazines, primarily The Magazine of Fantasy & Science Fiction, in the 1950s through 1970s. He also illustrated many book covers.

When Wernher von Braun organized a space flight symposium for Collier's, he invited Bonestell to illustrate his concepts for the future of spaceflight.  For the first time, spaceflight was shown to be a matter of the near future. Von Braun and Bonestell showed that it could be accomplished with the technology then existing in the mid-1950s, and that the question was that of money and will. Coming as they did at the beginning of the Cold War and just before the sobering shock of the launch of Sputnik, the 1952–54 Collier's series, "Man Will Conquer Space Soon!", was instrumental in kick-starting America's space program.

In 1986, Bonestell died in Carmel, California, with an unfinished painting on his easel.

Legacy

During his lifetime, Bonestell was honored internationally for the contributions he made to the birth of modern astronautics, from a bronze medal awarded by the British Interplanetary Society to a place in the International Space Hall of Fame to an asteroid named for him. The Conquest of Space won the 1951 International Fantasy Award for nonfiction, one of the first two fantasy or science fiction awards anywhere, at the British SF Convention. The Science Fiction Hall of Fame inducted Bonestell in 2005, the first year it considered non-literary contributors.

His paintings are prized by collectors and institutions such as the National Air and Space Museum and the National Collection of Fine Arts. One of his classic paintings, an ethereally beautiful image of Saturn seen from its giant moon Titan, has been called "the painting that launched a thousand careers." Wernher von Braun wrote that he had "learned to respect, nay fear, this wonderful artist's obsession with perfection. My file cabinet is filled with sketches of rocket ships I had prepared to help in his artwork—only to have them returned to me with…blistering criticism."

Additionally, Bonestell Crater on the planet Mars, and the asteroid 3129 Bonestell are named after him.

In 2016, the first ever album of Sun Ra vocal tracks was released, The Space Age Is Here To Stay, featuring sleeve art authorized by the Bonestell estate.

Books illustrated by Bonestell
Ley, Willy (1949), The Conquest of Space (Chesley Bonestell, Illustrator)
Across the Space Frontier (1952)
 Illustrations by Chesley Bonestell:
Constructing the moonships in the space station's orbit (endpapers)
The space station (p 11)
Spaceships coming in for a landing on the moon (p 63)
Landing on the moon (p 67)
Unloading the cargo ship on the moon (pp 76–77)
Exploration convoy crossing lunar plain (p 101)
Take-off from the moon (p 115)
Heuer, Kenneth (1953), The End of the World (Chesley Bonestell, Illustrator) (Reprinted and revised in 1957 as The Next Fifty Billion Years: An Astronomer's Glimpse into the Future, Viking Press)
The World We Live In (1955)
The Exploration of Mars (1956)
Man and the Moon (1961)
Rocket to the Moon (1961)
The Solar System (1961)
Beyond the Solar System (1964)
Mars (1964)
Beyond Jupiter (1972)
The Golden Era of the Missions (1974)
The Art of Chesley Bonestell, Ron Miller, Paper Tiger, (2001) 
Project Mars: A Technical Tale (2006)

Films with artwork by Bonestell (abbreviated list)
The Hunchback of Notre Dame (1939)
Only Angels Have Wings (1939)
Swiss Family Robinson (1940)
Citizen Kane (1941)
The Magnificent Ambersons (1942)
Destination Moon (1950)
War of the Worlds (1953)
Cat-Women of the Moon (1953) Unauthorized use of Bonestell art from the book, "The Conquest of Space"
Conquest of Space (1955)
Men into Space (TV series, 1959–60)
Chesley Bonestell: A Brush with the Future (Feature Length Documentary) (2018)

Documentaries
Bonestell appeared in the documentary The Fantasy Film Worlds of George Pal (1985) (Produced and directed by Arnold Leibovit).
A documentary about his life, Chesley Bonestell: A Brush with the Future, was produced in 2018.

Popular culture references
 Arthur C. Clarke, in his 1953 story "Jupiter Five", referred to Bonestell's astronomical illustrations appearing in Life Magazine in 1944.
 Robert A. Heinlein made Bonestell's name into a verb first in his 1958 juvenile Have Space Suit—Will Travel, then in his 1961 novel Stranger in a Strange Land: "Opener: zoom in on Mars, using stock or bonestelled shots, unbroken sequence, then dissolving to miniature matched set of actual landing place of Envoy".
 In the Star Trek: The Next Generation episode "Tapestry", a young Captain Picard is involved in a fight with aliens at the Bonestell Recreation Facility, a spaceport named after the artist.  This incident is first mentioned in the second season episode "Samaritan Snare."
In chapter 35 of The Long Mars, by Terry Pratchett and Stephen Baxter and set in the year 2045, the character Douglas Black says that "this world was ... just like a Chesley Bonestell painting, and all of them save Mac had to look up that reference to see what he meant."

See also
Chesley Awards
List of space artists
Robert McCall

Notes

References

Citations

Other sources
Miller, Ron and Frederick C. Durant III (1983), Worlds Beyond: The Art of Chesley Bonestell, Walsworth Pub Co 
Miller, Ron and Frederick C. Durant III (2001), The Art of Chesley Bonestell (Foreword by Melvin H. Schuetz), Paper Tiger 
Schuetz, Melvin H. (1999), Chesley Bonestell Space Art Chronology, Universal Publishers 
Schuetz, Melvin H. (2003), Supplement to A Chesley Bonestell Space Art Chronology .
Tuck, Donald H., ed.  The Encyclopedia of Science Fiction and Fantasy Volumes 1 and 2. Chicago: Advent Publications, Inc., 1974.

External links

 Chesley Bonestell, Bonestell LLC.
 
 
 
 Chesley Bonestell, a portrait by Ansel Adams
 Chesley Bonestell: A Brush with the Future, DMS Productions Services, Inc.
 
 Chesley Bonestell: A Brush With the Future

1888 births
1986 deaths
People associated with astronomy
Science fiction artists
American speculative fiction artists
Science Fiction Hall of Fame inductees
Space artists
Special effects people
Artists from San Francisco